Melaleuca lateritia, commonly known as the robin redbreast bush, is a plant in the myrtle family, Myrtaceae and is endemic to the south-west of Western Australia. It is also one of the most widely cultivated of the genus because of its attractive flowers which occur over a long period and for its adaptability to a range of climates.

Description
They are spirally arranged around the stem.

Taxonomy and naming
Melaleuca lateritia was first formally described in 1859 by Albert Gottfried Dietrich in Allgemeine Gartenzeitung, published by Christoph Friedrich Otto and A.G. Dietrich. The specific epithet (lateritia) is from the Latin lateritius, meaning "of bricks" referring to the brick-red colour of the flowers.

Distribution and habitat
Robin redbreast bush occurs in the Geraldton Sandplains, Jarrah Forest, Swan Coastal Plain and Warren biogeographic regions of Western Australia. It grows in sandy soil in swampy areas.

Conservation status
Melaleuca lateritia is listed as "not threatened" by the Government of Western Australia Department of Parks and Wildlife.

Use in horticulture
Melaleuca lateritia is widely cultivated and it is well established in general horticulture. Although native to a dry summer climate it is one of the more adaptable to the wetter summer conditions of Australia's east coast. It grows best in well-drained soil in a sunny position, responds well to pruning to keep it in shape and to annual fertilising at the end of the flowering season. Honeyeaters, especially the eastern spinebill and New Holland honeyeater visit the flowers in Canberra.

References

lateritia
Myrtales of Australia
Plants described in 1859
Endemic flora of Western Australia